The 2005-06 A1 Grand Prix of Nations, United Arab Emirates was held on the weekend of December 11, 2005 at the Dubai Autodrome.

Report

Practice

Qualifying
Session One of Qualifying was red-flagged after Salvador Durán of Mexico suffered a bad accident.

Sprint race

Main race

Results

Qualification 

Qualification took place on Saturday, December 10, 2005.

Sprint Race Results 

The Sprint Race took place on Sunday, December 11, 2005.

Main Race Results 

The Main Race took place on Sunday, December 11, 2005.

Total Points 

 Fastest Lap: A1 Team Ireland (1'46.497 / 182.2 km/h, lap 3 of Main Race)

References

United Arab Emirates
A1 Grand Prix